"Ain't That a Shame" is a song written by Fats Domino and Dave Bartholomew. Domino's recording of the song, originally stated as "Ain't It a Shame", released by Imperial Records in 1955, was a hit, eventually selling a million copies. It reached number 1 on the Billboard R&B chart and number 10 on the pop chart. The song is ranked number 438 on Rolling Stone magazine's 500 Greatest Songs of All Time list.

This recording was included in the debut Fats Domino album Rock and Rollin' with Fats Domino (1956) and next in the compilation Fats Domino Swings (12,000,000 Records) (1958). Later in 1963 the recording has been overdubbed by vocal chorus for the album Let's Dance with Domino (1963). In 1983 Fats Domino re-recorded the song; this recording was included in his last album Alive and Kickin''' (2006) under the title "Ain't That a Shame 2000".

The song gained national fame after being covered by Pat Boone. Domino's version soon became more popular, bringing his music to the mass market a half-dozen years after his first recording, "The Fat Man". After "Ain't That a Shame", mainstream artists began covering Domino's songs. Teresa Brewer, for instance, performed Domino's version of the folk song "Bo Weevil".

The song has also been covered by The Four Seasons (1963), John Lennon (1975), Paul McCartney (1988) and most notably, Cheap Trick (1978), among others.

 Pat Boone cover 

Pat Boone recorded the song in May 1955, just after the release of Fats Domino's single. This recording was released in the same month on single under the title "Ain't That a Shame" and was included in his debut album Pat Boone (1956). According to some sources, Boone suggested changing the title and lyrics to "Isn't That a Shame" to make it more appealing to a broader audience but was dissuaded by his producers. Nevertheless, Boone's recording of the song was his first Billboard number-one single, spending two weeks as number one on the Billboard "Most Played in Jukeboxes" charts. Domino complimented Boone's cover of the song. Boone liked to tell a story about a concert at which Domino invited Boone on stage, showed a big gold ring and said: "Pat Boone bought me this ring," since Domino and Bartholomew, as the song's writers, received royalties on it from record sales or radio airplay of other performers' cover versions of their song.

Cheap Trick cover

Cheap Trick's version charted at number 35 after being released on their 1978 live album Cheap Trick at Budokan. Cash Box described it as a "superb rave-up of the Fats Domino classic." Reportedly, this was Fats Domino's favorite cover. Domino also gave Cheap Trick his gold record for his 1955 single, which is held by guitarist Rick Nielsen.  Another live version of the song, recorded in 1999, was released on the 2001 album Silver.Classic Rock critic Malcolm Dome rated it as Cheap Trick's 4th greatest song, saying that even though it's a cover, "the band effectively made it their own."  Classic Rock History critic Michael Quinn rated it Cheap Trick's 8th best song, saying that it "starts off with more Bun E Carlos magic...then moves to a showcase of Rick Nielsen’s smarmy guitar work."

Cheap Trick performed the song live as the finale of the 2016 Rock and Roll Hall of Fame induction ceremony. They were joined by Robert Lamm, James Pankow, Lee Loughnane and Walter Parazaider of Chicago, David Coverdale and Glenn Hughes of Deep Purple, Steve Miller, Sheryl Crow, Grace Potter, Steven Van Zandt, Rob Thomas and Paul Shaffer.

Chart history

Other cover versions
A version of the song by the Four Seasons reached number 22 on the Billboard charts in 1963. It was included in their 1963 studio album Ain't That A Shame and 11 Others.  Cash Box described it as "a raunchy, medium-paced, multi-dance romancer."

"Ain't That a Shame" was the first song that John Lennon learned to play. He later covered it on the album Rock 'n' Roll (1975). Lennon's version is also the opening track on the 2007 tribute album Goin' Home: A Tribute to Fats Domino (Vanguard Records).

Fellow Beatles member Paul McCartney has also recorded the song on multiple occasions; first in 1988 on Снова в СССР, then in 1990 on Tripping the Live Fantastic. The latter was recorded live during his world tour.

Other artists to have covered Domino's original version include Hank Williams, Jr. with the Mike Curb Congregation (1971), Tanya Tucker on Lovin' and Learnin' (1976), Brownsville Station on their eponymous 1977 album, and Mud on their 1982 album Mud featuring Les Gray. On the other hand, Pat Torpey covered the Cheap Trick version on Odd Man Out: Y2K (1999).

In other media

Domino performed the song in the 1956 film Shake, Rattle & Rock!. The song is used in the films American Graffiti, October Sky, L.A. Story, School Ties and Mischief. It can be heard at the end of the Season Four finale of the television series The Shield. It was also included in the soundtrack for the 2010 video game Mafia II.

See alsoBillboard Top Rock'n'Roll Hits: 1955''

Notes and references

Fats Domino songs
The Four Seasons (band) songs
Songs about New Orleans
1955 singles
1963 singles
1979 singles
Live singles
Pat Boone songs
Grammy Hall of Fame Award recipients
Songs written by Dave Bartholomew
Cheap Trick songs
Vee-Jay Records singles
Epic Records singles
Dot Records singles
Song recordings produced by Bob Crewe
Imperial Records singles
1955 songs
Songs written by Fats Domino